Yevgeny Nikolayevich Kulikov (born 25 May 1950 in Sverdlovsk Oblast) is a former speed skater who specialised in the sprint.

Yevgeny Kulikov trained at Burevestnik Voluntary Sports Society. Competing for the Soviet Union he became the first to break the 38 seconds barrier on the 500 m in 1975 and over the course of the next two weeks he lowered his own 500 m world record three more times, finishing with a time of 37.00, exactly one second below the previous world record. He would remain the 500 m world record holder for 8 years. For his achievements he received the 1975 Oscar Mathisen Award.

At the 1976 Winter Olympics in Innsbruck, he won gold on the 500 m despite the fact that he had a cold and a fever during his race. As the defending 500 m Olympic Champion and world record holder, he won silver at the 1980 Winter Olympics in Lake Placid, being beaten by Eric Heiden.

At the World Sprint Championships, Kulikov won silver in 1975 and bronze in 1977. In 1981, Kulikov lowered his own 500 m world record once more, becoming the first man to break the 37-second barrier.

Records

World records 
Over the course of his career, Kulikov skated nine world records:

Source: SpeedSkatingStats.com

Personal records

References 

 Yevgeny Kulikov at SpeedSkatingStats.com
 Legends of Soviet Sport: Yevgeny Kulikov

External links
 
 
 
 

1950 births
Living people
Soviet male speed skaters
Russian male speed skaters
Olympic speed skaters of the Soviet Union
Olympic gold medalists for the Soviet Union
Olympic silver medalists for the Soviet Union
Olympic medalists in speed skating
Speed skaters at the 1976 Winter Olympics
Speed skaters at the 1980 Winter Olympics
Medalists at the 1976 Winter Olympics
Medalists at the 1980 Winter Olympics
Burevestnik (sports society) athletes
World record setters in speed skating
World Sprint Speed Skating Championships medalists
Sportspeople from Sverdlovsk Oblast